Bolton Valley is a mid-sized ski area in the town of Bolton in Chittenden County, Vermont, United States. It is located in close proximity to Burlington, the largest city in the state of Vermont. The community around the base of the ski area was listed as the Bolton Valley census-designated place prior to the 2020 census.

History
The resort was founded in 1966 by Ralph DesLauriers and his father. Bolton thrived for many years as a family-friendly resort and spawned two famous skiers, Rob and Eric DesLauriers, who went on to star in dozens of ski movies.  With their brother Adam, they founded Straight Up Films; Adam remains in the area with a more recent venture, Beech Seal Media, named for a ski trail at the resort and a unique type of communication in Vermont lore.

In 1971 Chateau des Monts, a 20 unit hotel condominium complex was completed next to the base lodge (later connected) by Charles P Jones and Land Development Incorporated.

Beginning around 1997, the resort has been under the control of a handful of new owners and struggled with financial viability.   However, it has stabilized under the leadership of industry veteran Bob Fries and seen steady improvement in the 2003-2004, 2004–2005, and 2005-2006 seasons, although just before the 2007-2008 season his shares in the company were bought by two locals, and Bolton Valley is now completely locally owned.

As of the Spring of 2017 the original owner Ralph DesLauriers and a small group of investors have purchased the mountain back from Red Stone Properties.  Ralph, along with his children are now operating Bolton once again.

Lifts and trails
Vertical drop: 
Trails: 71 trails 
Night Skiing: 12 trails
Skiable area: 165 acres (668,000 m²)
Bolton Valley has 6 lifts.

Nordic skiing
Bolton Valley has  of nordic skiing,  of which are groomed.

Westward orientation
Bolton Valley is one of the few westward facing ski areas in Vermont.

Wind turbine

In 2009, Bolton Valley installed a Northwind 100 wind turbine, which was made by Northern Power Systems. The turbine was projected to produce 300,000 kilowatt hours of electricity. It is located near the top of the Vista Quad chairlift.

Newsletter
Bolton Valley publishes a humorous weekly newsletter covering snow news, event listings, and deals.

References

External links
Bolton Valley Ski Area Website

Ski areas and resorts in Vermont
Buildings and structures in Chittenden County, Vermont
Tourist attractions in Chittenden County, Vermont
Census-designated places in Chittenden County, Vermont
Census-designated places in Vermont
Bolton, Vermont